Tyler Glenn Duff Jr. (September 12, 1925 – December 23, 2007) was an American film and television actor.

Life and career 
MacDuff was born in Hollywood, California. He attended Woodrow Wilson Junior High. MacDuff joined the U.S. Navy in 1943 and drove an LCVP Landing Craft in the first wave of the invasion of Saipan and Guam in 1944. In late 1944 and 1945, he was part of General Douglas MacArthur's invasion forces in the Philippine Islands. MacDuff then attended Pasadena City College, and performed at the Pasadena Playhouse. He also served as a director for stage productions. MacDuff began his film and television career in 1952, first appearing in the film No Room for the Groom, where he played the uncredited role of a soldier. He then appeared in the films Francis Goes to West Point and Bonzo Goes to College.

MacDuff earned popularity from his role in the 1954 film The Boy from Oklahoma, in which he played Billy the Kid. He also played Vance in the film The Bounty Hunter. MacDuff guest-starred in television programs including Gunsmoke, The Lone Ranger, Laramie, Adventures of Superman, Maverick, The Texan, Tales of Wells Fargo, Lawman, Perry Mason and Death Valley Days. He played Wes Parker in the 1956 film The Burning Hills. MacDuff also played Tom Williams in the 1957 film Fury at Showdown. He retired in 2003, last appearing in the 2003 film An American Reunion.

Death 
MacDuff died in December 2007 of heart failure in Pasadena, California, at the age of 82. He was buried in Riverside National Cemetery.

References

External links 

Rotten Tomatoes profile

1925 births
2007 deaths
People from Hollywood, Los Angeles
Male actors from Hollywood, Los Angeles
Male actors from California
American male film actors
American male television actors
20th-century American male actors
American theatre directors
Pasadena City College alumni
Western (genre) television actors
Burials at Riverside National Cemetery